Pozory is a rural locality (a village) in Polozovoskoye Rural Settlement, Bolshesosnovsky District, Perm Krai, Russia. The population was 37 as of 2010. There is 1 street.

Geography 
Pozory is located 57 km southwest of Bolshaya Sosnova (the district's administrative centre) by road. Lisya is the nearest rural locality.

References 

Rural localities in Bolshesosnovsky District